Secure Energy Services Inc. is a Canadian public energy services company, based in Calgary, Alberta.  It specializes in oilfield waste treatment and disposal.  It is listed on the Toronto Stock Exchange.

History 
Secure Energy Services was founded in 2007 by Rene Amirault and several partners.  It held an IPO in April 2010, raising C$57.5 million.  At the time, it had nine facilities.  In 2011, it acquired Marquis Alliance Energy Group for $131 million.  By 2014, Secure Energy had 24 facilities, and 13% of the Canadian environmental services market.

In 2014 and 2015, due to the decrease in oil prices, Secure Energy experienced significant challenges due to decreasing oil prices.  The company responded by laying off 300 workers, and its stock price decreased by half.  In 2017, it acquired Ceiba Energy Services for $26 million, as part of the consolidation among energy services firms.

Operations 

Secure Energy Services primarily provides oilfield waste treatment and disposal, including of wastewater.  As of 2018, it has 47 facilities in Western Canada and North Dakota, mostly in Alberta.  Most of the locations are for waste processing and disposal, but the company also runs 4 rail terminals.

Controversy 
In December 2017, local residents and Métis leaders protested a planned oilsands landfill by the company outside of Conklin, Alberta.  The protesters were concerned the landfill would contaminate waterways, scare wildlife, and create unpleasant smells. SECURE held an open house on December 7, 2017 to inform stakeholders about the project and the measures they take to ensure safe conditions in the communities they live and work in.

References 

Companies based in Calgary
Companies listed on the Toronto Stock Exchange
Oilfield services companies
Service companies of Canada